Llandefaelog Fach, sometimes simply called 'Llandefaelog', is a small village and community located in Powys, Wales. It includes the surrounding areas of Glan Honddu, Sarnau, Pwllgloyw and Garthbrengy. These areas border the village.  The nearest pubs and shops are in Brecon. Cradoc golf course is also nearby.

The village has a church dedicated to St Maelog. The church contains the Cross of Briamail, known as Croes Briamail in Welsh. https://upload.wikimedia.org/wikipedia/cy/5/5e/Croes_Briamail.jpg

In the churchyard are the remains of a striking 1816 mausoleum in Egyptian style for the owners of the nearby Penoyre estate. This has largely collapsed recently but previously black lead coffins were visible through its iron barred windows.

References
 Genuki: Llandyfaelog Fach, Breconshire
 Brecon | Brecon Beacons Cottage Holidays
 Interesting Information for Llandefaelog Fach, Brecon, Wales, LD3 9PP Postcode
 Llandefaelog Fach, St Maelog's Church, History & Visiting Information | Historic Wales Guide
 St. Maelog’s, Llandefaelog Fach - The Benefice of Dan yr Epynt
 

Villages in Powys